Zando is an American independent publisher based in New York City. Zando publishes literary fiction, non-fiction and young adult books. The company consists of imprints Zando, Zando Young Readers, SJP Lit, Gillian Flynn Books, Crooked Media Reads, Sweet July Books, Atlantic Editions, Get Lifted Books and Hillman Grad Books.

History
The company was founded in 2020 by Molly Stern, former publisher at Crown.  Zando is known for partnering with high-profile individuals, companies and brands to publish and promote books.    Zando is distributed by Ingram Content Group.

Publishing
Authors published by Zando include Samantha Allen, Steve Almond, Karamo Brown, Margot Douaihy,   Maurene Goo, Liv Little, among others. 

Zando's publishing partners include Sarah Jessica Parker,   The Atlantic, Ayesha Curry, Lena Waithe, John Legend, Crooked Media,   and Gillian Flynn. 

In 2022, Zando published Morbid co-host Alaina Urquhart's bestselling novel The Butcher and the Wren.

References 

Publishing companies based in New York City